Dejan Blazhevski (born 6 December 1985) is a Macedonian professional footballer who plays as a left winger for FK Vardar.

Club career
Blaževski had previously played for clubs such as Pelister, Vardar, Skopje, Bregalnica Delčevo and in Greece for Agrotikos Asteras.

In January 2014, Blaževski moved to Azerbaijan Premier League team Khazar Lankaran on an 18-month contract. In December 2014, Blaževski left Khazar Lankaran, going on to sign for FK Vardar.

On 24 June 2018, Tirana announced to have signed Blazhevski on a one-year contract with an option to renew. He made his official debut on 18 August in the 1–0 home loss to Kamza. He scored his first league goal on 16 September in the 3–1 win over Luftëtari Gjirokastër. It was Tirana's first top flight win in 484 days. Later on 3 October, he scored a brace in a 3–2 comeback win at Kastrioti Krujë to give Tirana its first away win since February 2016.

In August 2019, Blazhevski joined FK Makedonija Gjorče Petrov.

International career
Blaževski made his senior debut on 14 November 2012 in a friendly against Slovenia, as Macedonia won 3–2. His first goal came one month later in another friendly, a 1–4 away defeat to Poland.

Career statistics

Club

International

International goals
Scores and results list Macedonia's goal tally first.

Honours

Club
Vardar

Macedonian First Football League: 2014–15, 2015–16, 2016–17

Individual
Macedonian First Football League top goalscorer: 2013–14

References

External links

Profile at Macedonian Football 

1985 births
Living people
Footballers from Skopje
Association football wingers
Macedonian footballers
North Macedonia international footballers
FK Pelister players
Agrotikos Asteras F.C. players
Veria F.C. players
Pierikos F.C. players
FK Horizont Turnovo players
Khazar Lankaran FK players
FK Vardar players
KF Tirana players
FK Rabotnički players
FK Makedonija Gjorče Petrov players
Macedonian First Football League players
Football League (Greece) players
Azerbaijan Premier League players
Kategoria Superiore players
Macedonian expatriate footballers
Expatriate footballers in Greece
Macedonian expatriate sportspeople in Greece
Expatriate footballers in Albania
Macedonian expatriate sportspeople in Albania
Expatriate footballers in Azerbaijan
Macedonian expatriate sportspeople in Azerbaijan